The ceremonial of Benedict XVI (2005–2013) re-introduced several papal garments which had previously fallen into disuse.

Papal shoes
Pope Benedict XVI resumed the use of the traditional red papal shoes, which had not been used since early in the pontificate of Pope John Paul II. Contrary to the initial speculation of the press that the shoes had been made by the Italian fashion house Prada, the Vatican announced that the shoes were provided by the Pope's personal cobbler.

Papal headgear

On 21 December 2005, the Pope wore the camauro, the traditional red papal hat usually worn in the winter. It had not been seen since the pontificate of Pope John XXIII (1958–1963). On 6 September 2006, the Pope began wearing the red cappello romano (also called a saturno), a wide-brimmed hat for outdoor use. Rarely used by John Paul II, it was more widely worn by his predecessors.

Mozzetta
Pope Benedict XVI also restored the use of all three forms of the papal mozzetta. During his pontificate Benedict wore the winter papal mozzetta and the paschal mozzetta, both of which had last been last worn by Pope Paul VI. The winter papal mozzetta is of red velvet trimmed with white ermine, and the paschal mozzetta, worn only during the Eastertide, is of white damask silk trimmed with white ermine.

Pallium

During his installment address, Pope Benedict XVI spoke at length about the significance of the pallium, and he has used an ancient version of the vestment, an Eastern design, used by the popes of the first millennium.  Beginning with the Solemnity of Saints Peter and Paul (29 June 2008) however Benedict XVI reverted to a form similar to that worn by his recent predecessors, albeit in a larger and longer cut and with red crosses, therefore remaining distinct from pallia worn by metropolitans.

Benedict XVI also returned to wearing traditional forms of other liturgical vestments to emphasize the continuity of the papacy and the church.

Fanon
On 21 October 2012, during a canonisation mass, Pope Benedict wore the papal fanon and continued to do so in major papal liturgical events. The garment had not been used since the early 1980s when Pope John Paul II wore it once during a visit to Roman convent.

Tiara
One item that Benedict did not wear during his papacy is the papal tiara. Like his two immediate predecessors, Benedict chose not to be crowned with the tiara during his Inauguration Mass, nor did he wear it since that time. Unlike them, however, he has emphasized this decision by breaking with prior tradition in using a mitre instead of the tiara in his coat of arms. Other traditional pontifical vestments remain unused as well, including the pontifical gloves, and the papal slippers.

Reception

Charlotte Allen describes Benedict as "the pope of aesthetics"; "he has reminded a world that looks increasingly ugly and debased that there is such a thing as the beautiful—whether it's embodied in a sonata or an altarpiece or an embroidered cope or the cut of a cassock—and that earthly beauty ultimately communicates a beauty that is beyond earthly things."

Franco Zeffirelli, the famed Italian film director of numerous lavish productions, criticized the Pontiff's vestments as being too "showy."  He said that, "These are not times of high-tailored church wear."  Zeffirelli believes that Pope Benedict's garments are "too sumptuous" and make the pontiff appear cold and removed from his surroundings. The Vatican explained Benedict's use of traditional vestments such as older, much taller miters during his "Urbi et Orbi" Christmas greeting by pointing to the need "to underline the continuity of today's liturgical celebration with that which characterized the life of the church in the past."  The Pope's liturgist likened the use of vestments worn by previous popes to annotations in papal documents, where "a pope cites the pontiffs who preceded him in order to indicate the continuity of the church's magisterium."

In August 2008 the Italian Association for Defense of Animals and the Environment called on Pope Benedict to stop wearing animal furs such as the ermine-trimmed camauro and mozetta whose usage he revived. The group cited the Pontiff's famous love of cats and started an online petition to try to persuade Benedict to switch to synthetics.

References

Pope Benedict XVI